The 1992–93 Women's European Champions Cup was the 32nd and final edition of Europe's competition for national champions women's handball clubs, taking place September 1992 and 15 May 1993. Starting with the following edition the competition was run by EHF, which changed its name to Champions League and its system to include a group stage. Defending champion Hypo Niederösterreich defeated Vasas Budapest in the final to win its fourth title in five years.

Qualifying round

First round

Quarter-finals

Semifinals

Final

References

Women's EHF Champions League
Ihf Women's European Cup, 1992-93
Ihf Women's European Cup, 1992-93
Eur
Eur